Jon Barlow Hudson (born 1945 in Billings, Montana, United States) is an American sculptor.

Life and work
Hudson was born in Montana and lived in Casper, Wyoming for the first five years of his life.  He experimented with different art forms as a child and was very interested in photography as a teen. After graduation from Dreux American A.F.B. High School in France in 1963, he attended Urbana College, in Urbana, OH, where he began painting. This led him to transfer to the Dayton Art Institute from 1965-67. Hudson switched to traveling for a year, going first to Senegal for six months working, with his father on a ground water project. He then traveled to study at the  Kunstakademie in Stuttgart, Germany. After a motorcycle accident Hudson returned to the states and worked as assistant to NY/VT sculptor Charles Ginnever. After a year with Ginnever he attended the newly starting California Institute of the Arts, studying with Allan Kaprow, Paul Brach, Lloyd Hamroll, and Taiji with Marshall Ho'o: receiving his BFA in 1971 & MFA in 1972. Having had enough of city life, Hudson signed on to the Royal Drift Gold Mine, outside Magalia, CA, above Paradise, and built the mine working equipment for two years.  Subsequently, the Dayton Art Institute, in Dayton, Ohio awarded him his BFA in 1975. Hudson taught sculpture at university for several years, then focused on creating public sculptures since 1976. Since then his large-scale public sculptures have been installed in 27 countries around the world.

Hudson's first international commission was for two major large-scale stainless steel sculptures for the World Expo 88 in Brisbane, Australia. Hudson's sculpture PARADIGM, at 100 feet high in stainless steel, was the first in the world to be designed with the help of a computer, and the first to have a computerized lighting system installed. MORNING STAR II is reinstalled in the Brisbane Botanical Gardens.  Hudson usually works with stone and stainless steel but has also worked with brass, copper, bronze, water, light, glass and more.

He is currently based in Yellow Springs, Ohio.

Examples of artworks
2013 - FENESTRAE AETERNITATIS:BOOKS INTO INFINITY - White Rock Hills Public Library, Dallas, Texas
2012 - EIDOLON:ATOM - Chistye Prudy International Sculpture Park, Penza, Russia
2011 - SYNCHRONICITY XI:TSINGHUA - Tsinghua University, Beijing, China
2008 - WIND DRAGON - Beijing Chaoyang Olympic Park, China
2004 - TS'UNG TUBE:MEMORIAL TO 2 & 29TH.DIV. - St. Clair sur Elle, Cerisy la Foret Normandy, France
2001 - TS'UNG TUBES:MEMORIAL TO WTC 9/11, Escuela del Mármol de Fines Sculpture Park, Fines-Almería-Andalucía-Spain
1993 - FFENESTRAE AETERNITATIS:WINDOWS OVER THE DANUBE - Dunaferr Steel Sculpture Park, Dunaújváros, Hungary
1989 - SCRIVANIA II and TAVOLO GRIGIO - Wittenberg University, Chackers Theater, Springfield, Ohio
1988 - PARADIGM - World Expo 88, Brisbane, Queensland
1982 - RAVEN II - University of Nebraska Temple Theater, Lincoln, Nebraska
1976 - DJAMILA and MUSA - Boone National Bank, Columbia, Missouri

Gallery

References

External links
Jon Barlow Hudson's website
Jon Barlow Hudson's sculpture.org with list of works
Jon Barlow Hudson Papers relating to the Morning Star II and Paradigm sculptures in Brisbane, State Library of Queensland.

20th-century American sculptors
20th-century American male artists
21st-century American sculptors
21st-century American male artists
American male sculptors
1945 births
Living people